Rico Engler (born April 28, 1987) is a German footballer who  plays as a striker for SV 1900 Flößberg. He first joined the club as a youth (when they were still called VfB Leipzig), and broke into the first team in 2006. Four years later he joined SV Babelsberg 03 of the 3. Liga, and made his debut as a substitute for Anton Müller in a 1–0 defeat to SV Wehen Wiesbaden. After one season with the Potsdam club, he returned to Lokomotive Leipzig in July 2011.

External links

1987 births
Living people
1. FC Lokomotive Leipzig players
SV Babelsberg 03 players
People from Borna
3. Liga players
German footballers
Association football forwards
Footballers from Saxony